Raymond Waddy, Jr. (born August 21, 1956) is a former American football cornerback for the National Football League's Washington Redskins, the Canadian Football League's BC Lions and the United States Football League's San Antonio Gunslingers. He played college football and ran track for Texas A&I University (now Texas A&M University - Kingsville).  He is currently a teacher and coach in the Brazosport Independent School District.  He is a member of Omega Psi Phi fraternity.

External links
 

1956 births
Living people
People from Freeport, Texas
Players of American football from Texas
Sportspeople from the Houston metropolitan area
American football cornerbacks
Texas A&M–Kingsville Javelinas football players
Washington Redskins players
San Antonio Gunslingers players
Junior college football players in the United States